Tove Bruunstrøm Madsen, later Jensen (October 10, 1920 – April 13, 2007), was a Danish backstroke and freestyle swimmer who competed in the 1936 Summer Olympics. She was born in Copenhagen. She was the wife of Finn Jensen. In 1936 she finished fifth in the 100 metre backstroke competition. She was also a member of the Danish relay team which finished seventh in the 4×100 metre freestyle relay event.

External links
Tove Bruunstrøm's profile at Sports Reference.com

Swimmers from Copenhagen
Olympic swimmers of Denmark
Swimmers at the 1936 Summer Olympics
1920 births
2007 deaths
Danish female freestyle swimmers
Danish female backstroke swimmers